Bezold's abscess is an abscess deep to the sternocleidomastoid muscle where pus from mastoiditis erodes through the cortex of the mastoid part of the temporal bone, medial to the attachment of sternocleidomastoid, extends into the infratemporal fossa, and deep to the investing layer of the deep cervical fascia. It is a rare complication of acute otitis media.

Symptoms
Symptoms may include:
 Severe pain in perimastoid region
 Difficulty in swallowing (dysphagia)
 Sore throat
 Difficulty in breathing (dyspnoea)
 Nuchal rigidity
 Fever

Diagnosis
CT scan of mastoid and swelling of the neck.

Differential diagnosis should include:
 Acute upper jugular lymphadenitis
 Abscess or mass in Lower part of parotid
 Infected branchial cyst
 Parapharyngeal abscess
 Jugular vein thrombosis

Treatment
Cortical mastoidectomy for mastoiditis. Exploration of fistulous opening into the soft tissues of neck. Drainage of the neck abscess from a separate incision and insertion of a drain. Administration of intravenous antibiotics guided by the culture and sensitivity of the pus.

Eponym
It is named after Friedrich Bezold (German otologist, 1842–1908).

References

External links 

Diseases of middle ear and mastoid

pl:Ropień Bezolda